Zebulun or Zevulun ben Isaac was a hypothetical  Jewish Turkic ruler of the Khazars mentioned in the Khazar Correspondence. He probably reigned in the late ninth century CE. Little is known about Zebulun's reign. As with other Bulanid rulers, it is unclear whether he was Khagan or Khagan Bek of the Khazars, although the latter is more likely.  Historical authenticity and accuracy  of the only document mentioning his name has been questioned.

References

Sources
Kevin Alan Brook. The Jews of Khazaria. 2nd ed. Rowman & Littlefield Publishers, Inc, 2006.
Douglas M. Dunlop, The History of the Jewish Khazars, Princeton, N.J.: Princeton University Press, 1954.
Norman Golb and Omeljan Pritsak, Khazarian Hebrew Documents of the Tenth Century. Ithaca: Cornell Univ. Press, 1982.

Khazar rulers
Jewish monarchs
9th-century rulers in Europe
Jewish royalty